Masuyama (written: ,  or ) is a Japanese surname. People with this surname include:

, Japanese statistician
, Japanese voice actress
, Japanese footballer

See also
Matsuyama (disambiguation)

Japanese-language surnames